The Canyon Fire was a wildfire that burned on  Vandenberg Space Force Base in Santa Barbara County, California during September 2016. By the time the fire was contained on September 24, it had burned  of land. Due to the nature of the activities that take place on the Base, there were a number of unique challenges posed during the fire including the presence of potentially hazardous materials.

The fire

Due to the location of the fire, burning in a remote canyon on the southern half of the base, access was difficult for fire crews. On September 18 the fire jumped to over  prompting evacuation warnings for homes on San Miguelito Canyon south of Lompoc and east of the base.

As the fire continued to spread, firefighters were faced with a number of unique challenges. Base officials warned that there was possibly unexploded ordnance that was left over from the days when the base was used during World War II and the Korean War.

On September 21, a Ventura County OES water tender assigned to the fire crashed on Highway 246 just outside Lompoc. The crash killed one firefighter and sent the second to the hospital with minor injuries. The individual was identified as engineer Ryan Osler.

The fire was fully contained on September 24 after burning .

Effects

A United Launch Alliance Atlas V carrying the WorldView-4 earth observation satellite that was set to launch on September 18 from Vandenberg AFB Space Launch Complex 3 had to be delayed. According to the Emergency Operations Center commander, base procedures require firefighting crews to be standing by for every launch, thus the launch was delayed so that all resources could concentrate on the growing fire. While all fires at Vandenberg were contained by September 27, facilities and instrumentation needed to be surveyed for damage and, due to the delays, the launch did not occur until November 11, 2016.

The fire also caused widespread power outages in multiple facilities on the base including at least one fire station which had to operate on generator power.

See also
2016 California wildfires

References

External links

 Canyon Fire information on InciWeb

2016 California wildfires
Wildfires in Santa Barbara County, California
Vandenberg Space Force Base